The Questa Solar Facility is a 1.17 MWp (1.0 MWAC) concentrator photovoltaics (CPV) power station in Questa, New Mexico.  Upon its completion in late 2010, it was one of the largest CPV facilities in the world, and the first utility-scale installation of Concentrix Solar technology in the United States.  Annual electricity production is expected to average about 2.1 GW·h, and is being sold to the Kit Carson Electric Cooperative under a 20-year power purchase agreement (PPA).

Facility details

The facility was built by Chevron Technology Ventures on a reclaimed site previously used for the collection and storage of molybdenum mine tailings. It consists of 173 dual-axis-tracking CX-P6 systems, each of which supports 90 CX-75 CPV modules.  Each module contains 200 fresnel lens to concentrate sunlight 500 times onto multijunction photovoltaic cells.  These features enable higher efficiencies - about 40% for cells and 27% for modules - than other photovoltaic technologies. 

Each of the 173 trackers has its own grid-connected inverter, which also serves as the control system of the mechanical tracking and as the communication port with its own IP address. The inverter technology was developed by Fraunhofer ISE in cooperation with Concentrix Solar and has an efficiency of 96%. For control and monitoring, the facility also includes DNI sensors, GNI sensors and wind sensors. A detailed analysis of the system and power plant performance can be made based on data that is taken at one-minute intervals.

Electricity production

See also

 Alamosa Solar Generating Project
 Hatch Solar Energy Center
 Newberry Springs CPV Power Plant
 List of photovoltaic power stations
 Renewable energy in the United States
 Solar power in New Mexico
 Solar power in the United States

External links
 VIDEO: Soitec CPV Solar Power Plant near Taos, NM
 VIDEO: Chevron Builds Solar Field in New Mexico
 Field Experience Of Concentrix Solar's CPV Systems In Different Climatic Conditions

References

Energy infrastructure completed in 2010
Solar power stations in New Mexico
Photovoltaic power stations in the United States